The 2020-21 Malian Première Division is the 54th season of the highest level of professional football in Mali. The championship was contested by 20 teams, starting in February 2021 and finishing in July 2021. Stade Malien were the holders going into the season following their 22nd title in the 2019-20 season, and successfully defended their title by winning the Carré d'As.

Overview
Following the expansion from 18 teams in 2017 to 23 in 2019-20, the league was reduced to 20 teams for the 2020–21 season. This involved 6 teams being relegated from the Première Division (AS Performance, AS Sabana, AS Avenir, AS Bamako, JS Centre Salif Keita, and Mamahira AC) and only 3 teams being promoted from the second tier (CAS Sévaré, AS Douanes and AS Korofina). Like the previous season, the league was divided into two round-robin pools. The top two teams in each pool qualify for the Championship Play-Off (Carré d'As in French), a further round-robin to determine the league champion, while the bottom two in each pool get relegated.

Main Stage

Pool A

Pool B

Play-Offs

Championship play-off

Stadiums:

References

Malian Première Division seasons